Siamesed cylinders are engine cylinders arranged in such a way that they have no channels between them to allow water or other coolant to circulate.

Cylinders are generally arranged in this manner when the engine block is of limited size or when stability of the cylinder bores is of concern, such as in racing engines. The advantage is that the engine block will be reduced in size, or the bore can be increased in size.  The disadvantage is a higher temperature between two cylinders, requiring a stronger engine block to avoid distortion of the metal, and better gasket sealing between the two bores.

References

Engine cooling systems
Engines